Amanayé (Amanaje) is a possibly extinct Tupi language last spoken in the town of São Domingos on the Capim River in Pará State, Brazil. The closely related but possibly distinct language is Ararandewara, which is spoken at the headwaters of the Moju River (Lang 1914).

References

Tupi–Guarani languages
Languages of Brazil
Extinct languages of South America